is a Japanese boys love manga written and illustrated by Lily Hoshino.  It was released in English by Yen Press in October 2008.

Reception
Anime News Network said that Love Quest is a "serious stinker", but Mania Entertainment found it "surprisingly entertaining", regarding Hoshino's art as redeeming the story.  Deb Aoki for About.com felt that Hoshino's sense of humour was the saving grace of Love Quest, and described it as "disposable BL fun".  PopCultureShock describes the story as being quite good for a oneshot, and roughly equivalent to a romance novel.

References

External links

2006 manga
Houbunsha manga
Manga anthologies
Yen Press titles
Yaoi anime and manga